"This One's for the Children" is a 1989 single from New Kids on the Block. The lead vocals were sung by Jordan Knight and Donnie Wahlberg. Taken from the group's holiday album, Merry, Merry Christmas, the single peaked at #7 on the Billboard Hot 100 in December 1989, and #9 on the UK singles chart in December 1990.

Featured on the song's B-side was "Funky, Funky Xmas," which was an airplay only single promoted during the holiday season. The rap/lead vocals were sung by Jordan Knight, Joey McIntyre, Danny Wood, and Donnie Wahlberg.

Music video
The video starts with different languages saying "This One's for the Children."  It features the band near a piano with Jordan Knight playing it and co-singing with Donnie Wahlberg while showing young children from around the world.

Charts and certifications

Weekly charts

Year-end charts

Certifications

References

External links
 Official video

1989 singles
New Kids on the Block songs
American Christmas songs
Columbia Records singles
Songs written by Maurice Starr
Song recordings produced by Maurice Starr
Pop ballads
1989 songs
1980s ballads